Eoophyla evidens is a moth in the family Crambidae. It was described by Hou-Hun Li, Ping You and Shu-Xia Wang in 2003. It is found in Guangxi, China.

References

Eoophyla
Moths described in 2003